Jenő Ábrahám (1903 – 1973) was a Hungarian and Yugoslav international football player.

Born in Szeged, Hungary, he started playing in his hometown club Szegedi AK (SZAK).  In 1922 he came to Yugoslavia to play in FK Vojvodina. In September 1924 he was back in Hungary playing with SZAK. In summer 1925 he moved to another Yugoslav club, the Zagreb giants 1. HŠK Građanski where he would play one season and win the 1926 Yugoslav First League. He usually played as left-winger. In 1926 he left Yugoslavia and joined Bástya playing with them in the Hungarian Championship between 1926 and 1930.

Between 1922 and 1923, he played two matches for the Yugoslavia national football team while playing with Vojvodina having scored two goals. He participated, and scored twice, in the friendly match played on 28 July 1922 in Zagreb against Czechoslovakia, which was a first ever win of the Yugoslav national team, with a final result of 4–3. His other, and last, match was a year later, on 3 July 1923, in a friendly match in Kraków, against Poland, a 2–1 win.

Born as Jenő Ábrahám, while playing in Yugoslavia, and in the national team, he was recorded in the chronicles as "Saraz", a Serbo-Croatian transliteration of the Hungarian word "Száraz", which means "Dry" in Hungarian, a name he received probably because of his looks. Many websites confuse Jenő Ábrahám with Eugen "Geza" Ábrahám.  The two played in FK Vojvodina in same time, and usually the first was recorded as Saraz I and the second as Saraz II. Many football-specialized internet websites merged the two and erroneously named the player described in this article as Geza Abraham Sarasz.

References

External sources
 Abraham Sarasz Geza at Reprezentacija.rs

1903 births
1973 deaths
Sportspeople from Szeged
Hungarian footballers
Hungarian expatriate footballers
Yugoslav footballers
Yugoslavia international footballers
Association football midfielders
FK Vojvodina players
HŠK Građanski Zagreb players
Yugoslav First League players
Szegedi AK players
Nemzeti Bajnokság I players
Expatriate footballers in Yugoslavia
Hungarian expatriate sportspeople in Yugoslavia